Jane Clarke  (née Morgan; born 1950) is an English biochemist and academic. Since October 2017, she has served as President of Wolfson College, Cambridge. She is also Professor of Molecular Biophysics, a Wellcome Trust Senior Research Fellow in the Department of Chemistry at the University of Cambridge. She was previously a Fellow of Trinity Hall, Cambridge.

Early life and education
Clarke was born Jane Morgan in London on 10 September 1950. She was educated at the University of York where she graduated with a first-class honours degree in biochemistry in 1972. She went on to study for a Postgraduate Certificate in Education (PGCE) at the University of Cambridge in 1973. Clarke was a science teacher in several secondary schools, and a Head of Science at Northumberland Park School, Tottenham, from 1973 to 1986.

Clarke married Christopher Clarke in 1973 with whom she would go on to have one son and one daughter. He obtained a job in the United States and the family moved there. Since Clarke was unable to work as a teacher, through not having appropriate qualifications she decided to update her scientific knowledge through a Master of Science degree in applied biology, awarded in 1990 from the Georgia Institute of Technology. This experience made her decide to seek a career in research related to proteins. She was subsequently awarded a Doctor of Philosophy degree in 1993 for investigations of Bacterial Ribonuclease (Barnase) from the University of Cambridge supervised by Alan Fersht.

Research and career
Clarke was appointed a Wellcome Trust Senior Research Fellow in 2001, a Professor of Molecular Biophysics in 2009 and a Fellow of Trinity Hall, Cambridge, in 2010. On 1 October 2017, she became the President of Wolfson College, Cambridge.

Clarke's research investigates protein folding, in particular:
 Studies of structurally related proteins
 Multidomain proteins: effects of sequence on folding and misfolding
 Folding and assembly: intrinsically disordered proteins

Clarke's research has been funded by the Wellcome Trust, Medical Research Council (MRC) and the Biotechnology and Biological Sciences Research Council (BBSRC).

She has been the author or co-author of over 100 scientific papers and book chapters including:
 Sigrid Milles and 11 other authors including Jane Clarke (2015) Plasticity of an ultrafast interaction between nucleoporins and nuclear transport receptors. Cell 163 734–745
 Madeleine B. Borgia, Alessandro Borgia, six others and Jane Clarke (2011) Single-molecule fluorescence reveals sequence-specific misfolding in multidomain proteins. Nature 474  662–665 
 Alessandro Borgia, Philip M. Williams and Jane Clarke (2008) Single-molecule studies of protein folding. Annual Review of Biochemistry 77 101–125
 Jung-Hoon Han, Sarah Batey, Adrian A. Nickson, Sarah A. Teichmann and Jane Clarke (2007) The folding and evolution of multidomain proteins. Nature Reviews Molecular Cell Biology 8 319–330

Awards and honours
In 2010, Clarke was awarded the US Genomics award from the Biophysical Society. Clarke was also elected a Fellow of the Royal Society of Chemistry (FRSC) and a Fellow of the Academy of Medical Sciences (FMedSci) in 2013. Her nomination for the Academy of Medical Sciences in 2013 reads:  Clarke was elected a Fellow of the Royal Society (FRS) in 2015. Her certificate of election reads: 

In 2021 she spoke about her career in the BBC Radio 4 programme The Life Scientific.

References

Living people
Fellows of the Royal Society of Chemistry
Fellows of the Royal Society
Fellows of the Academy of Medical Sciences (United Kingdom)
1950 births
Members of the University of Cambridge Department of Chemistry
British biochemists
Biophysicists
Women biophysicists
Scientists from London
Alumni of the University of York
Alumni of the University of Cambridge
Fellows of Trinity Hall, Cambridge
Presidents of Wolfson College, Cambridge
Female Fellows of the Royal Society